Every year, the French association TV France International organizes the Export Award that rewards the best-selling French television programs worldwide, in the three categories: animation, documentary and drama. This award highlights both the economic and cultural impact of program exports and pay special tribute to the dynamic of French companies in charge of their international distribution. 

The 10th Export Award was directed by Xavier Gouyou Beauchamps, President of TV France International, during a prestigious soirée celebrating the PROCIREP Producer's Prize in Paris on December, 9th 2012. The 9 nominees were chosen according to the volume and level of their international sales. The winners among them were chosen by a panel of 12 000 professionals of the television sector. The 2013 Export Award winners were:

 animation: The Jungle Bunch - Back to the Ice Floe (distributed by PGS Entertainment)
 documentary: Apocalypse - Hitler (distributed by France Télévisions Distribution)
 and fiction: The Returned (distributed by Zodiak Rights)

Previous winners:

Notes & references 

Television in France
France TV International: website